Khvorzuq (also Romanized as Khvorzūq, Khowrzūq, Khowrz̄ūq, Khūrzūq, Khurzuq, and Khvor Z̄owq; also known as Khorzūq, Khowrz̄ūg, and Khūzūq) is a city in the Central District of Borkhar County, Isfahan Province, Iran.  At the 2006 census, its population was 20,301, in 5,478 families.

References

Populated places in Borkhar County

Cities in Isfahan Province